The Simplon Pass (Lombard: Pass del Sempiün) is a high mountain pass between the Pennine Alps and the Lepontine Alps in Switzerland. It connects Brig in the canton of Valais with Domodossola in Piedmont (Italy). The pass itself and the villages on each side of it, such as Gondo, are in Switzerland. The Simplon Tunnel was built beneath the vicinity of the pass in the early 20th century to carry rail traffic between the two countries.

There are several high peaks around that can be climbed directly from the pass. These include Wasenhorn, Hubschhorn, Breithorn (Simplon), and Monte Leone.

History

There had been a locally used passage through the mountains here for several centuries, but the pass acquired international significance during the Napoleonic occupation. Between 1801 and 1805 the Simplon Road was constructed by the engineer Nicolas Céard at the direction of the emperor in order to transport artillery pieces through the pass between the Rhône valley and Italy. Since then, the pass has been usable by road vehicles: first post carriages, replaced early in the twentieth century by post buses.

The road was periodically improved and in 1950 the cantonal authorities created a plan whereby the pass could be kept open all through the year, and not closed to traffic between October and late April like most Alpine passes at this altitude. The improvements included several lengthy avalanche shelters along the more exposed stretches of road and the expansion of certain road tunnels to accommodate full size tourist coaches which were significantly taller than the post buses used for local passengers.
The former Simplon département (the Swiss canton Valais) was named after the pass.

The Simplon Pass was also outfitted with rails for train service. The -long Simplon Tunnel was opened in 1906.  The historic Orient Express used the Simplon route intermittently during the twentieth century, as it carried passengers between Istanbul and Paris.

The Hospice du Simplon, at the top of the pass, is owned by the Congregation of Canons Regular at Grand-Saint-Bernard.

Monuments

During the Second World War, officers of the 11th Alpine Brigade of the Swiss Army, based in Zwischbergen, proposed the construction of the stone monument depicting an eagle, the symbol of the brigade. The Bernese architect Erwin Friedrich Baumann designed the monument based on the use of granite blocks from the old fortification of Gondo (a town near the pass) to build a statue about nine meters high. The monument was inaugurated in September 1944.

In 2005, a memorial was built representing the 200th anniversary of the construction of the "Napoleon Road".

See also

 Val Divedro
 List of highest paved roads in Europe
 List of mountain passes
 List of the highest Swiss passes

Picture

Gallery

Bibliography
 Nicola Pfund, Sui passi in bicicletta - Swiss Alpine passes by bicycle, Fontana Edizioni, 2012, p. 122-127.

References

External links 

Profile on climbbybike.com

Mountain passes of Valais
Mountain passes of the Alps
Lepontine Alps